Kratzeburg is a municipality in the district Mecklenburgische Seenplatte, in Mecklenburg-Vorpommern, Germany.

External links

References

Grand Duchy of Mecklenburg-Strelitz